Otto VI, Margrave of Brandenburg-Salzwedel, nicknamed Otto the Short ( – 1303 in Lehnin) was a member of the House of Ascania and co-ruler of Brandenburg.  He was a son of Margrave Otto III and his wife, Beatrice of Bohemia.

In 1267, his father died and Otto succeeded as margrave, jointly with his brothers and cousins.

In 1279, Otto married Hedwig, the daughter of King Rudolph I of Germany.  This marriage remained childless.

In 1286, he abdicated and became a Knight Templar.  Later, he became a Cistercian monk.

House of Ascania
Margraves of Brandenburg
1250s births
Year of birth uncertain
1303 deaths
13th-century German nobility